The White Revolution ( Enqelāb-e Sefid) or the Shah and People Revolution ( Enqelāb-e Shāh o Mardom) was a far-reaching series of reforms resulting in aggressive modernization in Iran launched on 26 January 1963 by the Shah, Mohammad Reza Pahlavi, which lasted until 1979. The reforms resulted in a great redistribution of wealth to Iran's working class, explosive economic growth in subsequent decades, rapid urbanization, and deconstruction of Iran's feudalist customs.

The reforms were characterized by high economic growth rates, major investments in infrastructure, substantial growth in per capita wealth and literacy of Iranians. The economic growth and education advancement arguably paved the way for the Shah's military arms build-up and the establishment of Iran as a major geopolitical power in the Middle East. It consisted of several elements, including land reform, sale of some state-owned factories to finance the land reform, construction of an expanded road, rail, and air network, a number of dam and irrigation projects, the eradication of diseases such as malaria, the encouragement and support of industrial growth, enfranchisement of women, nationalization of forests and pastures, formation of literacy and health corps for rural isolated areas, and institution of profit-sharing schemes for workers in the industry. In the 1960s and 1970s, the Shah sought to develop a more independent foreign policy and established working relationships with the Soviet Union and eastern European nations. In subsequent decades, per capita income for Iranians greatly increased, and oil revenue fueled an enormous increase in state funding for industrial development projects.

The White Revolution launched government-subsidized land grants to millions of working-class families and the creation of Iran's Literacy corps who doubled the nations literacy rates. The Shah wanted all Iranian citizens to be able to live an educated and prosperous lifestyle. The bulk of the program was aimed at Iran's peasantry while redistributing the aristocrat landlord class wealth down to working class Iranians. Thus the White Revolution in Iran represented a new attempt to introduce reform from above and preserve traditional power patterns. Through land reform, the essence of the White Revolution, the Shah hoped to ally himself with the peasantry in the countryside, and hoped to sever their ties with the aristocracy in the city.

In order to legitimize the White Revolution, the Shah called for a national referendum in early 1963 in which 5,598,711 people voted for the reforms, and 4,115 voted against the reforms, though the referendum was boycotted by the opposition to the Shah. The White Revolution contributed towards the economic and technological advancement of Iran.

Reforms

Mohammad Reza Shah had intended it to be a non-violent regeneration of Iranian society through economic and social reforms, with the ultimate long-term aim of transforming Iran into a global economic and industrial power. The Shah introduced economic concepts such as profit-sharing for workers and initiated massive government-financed heavy industry projects, as well as the nationalization of forests and pastureland. Most important, however, were the land reform programs which saw the traditional landed elites of Iran lose much of their influence and power. Nearly 90% of Iranian sharecroppers became landowners as a result.

Socially, the platform granted women more rights and poured money into education, especially in the rural areas.  A Literacy Corps was established, which allowed young men to fulfill their compulsory military service by working as village literacy teachers.

The White Revolution consisted of 19 elements that were introduced over a period of 16 years, with the first 6 introduced on January 9, 1963, and put to a national referendum on January 26, 1963.

 Land Reforms Program and Abolishing "Feudalism": The government bought the land during the Iranian Land Reform from the feudal landlords at what was considered to be a fair price and sold it to the peasants at 30% below the market value, with the loan being payable over 25 years at very low interest rates. This made it possible for 1.5 million peasant families, who had once been little more than slaves, to own the lands that they had been cultivating all their lives. Given that the average size of a peasant family was 5, the land reforms program brought freedom to approximately 9 million people, or 40% of Iran's population.
 Nationalization of Forests and Pasturelands: Many measures were introduced, not only to protect the national resources and stop the destruction of forests and pasturelands, but also to further develop and cultivate them. More than 9 million trees were planted in 26 regions, creating 70,000 acres (280 km2) of "green belts" around cities and on the borders of the major highways.
 Privatization of the Government Owned Enterprises, selling shares in manufacturing plants and factories to the public and the old feudal lords, thus creating a whole new class of factory owners who could now help to industrialize the country.
 Profit Sharing for industrial workers in private sector enterprises, giving the factory workers and employees 20% share of the net profits of the places where they worked and securing bonuses based on higher productivity or reductions in costs.
 Extending the Right to Vote to Women, who previously did not enjoy this right. This measure was criticized by some of the clergy.
 Formation of the Literacy Corps, so that those who had a high school diploma and were required to serve their country as soldiers could do so by fighting illiteracy in the villages. In 1963 approximately 2/3 of the population was illiterate, with 1/3 found mainly in the capital city of Tehran.
 Formation of the Health Corps to extend public health care throughout the villages and rural regions of Iran. In 3 years, almost 4,500 medical groups were trained; nearly 10 million cases were treated by the Corps.
 Formation of the Reconstruction and Development Corps to teach the villagers the modern methods and techniques of farming and keeping livestock. Agricultural production between 1964 and 1970 increased by 80% in tonnage and 67% in value.
 Formation of the Houses of Equity where 5 village elders would be elected by the villagers, for a period of 3 years, to act as arbitrators in order to help settle minor offences and disputes. By 1977 there were 10,358 Houses of Equity serving over 10 million people living in over 19,000 villages across the country.
 Nationalization of all Water Resources, introduction of projects and policies in order to conserve and benefit from Iran's limited water resources. Many dams were constructed and five more were under construction in 1978. A result of these measures was the area of land under irrigation increased from 2 million acres (8,000 km2), in 1968, to 5.6 million in 1977.
 Urban and Rural Modernization and Reconstruction with the help of the Reconstruction and Development Corps. Building of public baths, schools and libraries; installing water pumps and power generators for running water and electricity. 
 Didactic Reforms that improved the quality of education by diversifying the curriculum in order to adapt to the necessities of life in the modern world.
 Workers' Right to Own Shares in the Industrial Complexes where they worked by turning industrial units, with 5 years history and over, into public companies, where up to 99% of the shares in the state-owned enterprises and 49% of the shares of the private companies would be offered for sale to the workers of the establishment at first and then to the general public.
 Price Stabilization and campaign against unreasonable profiteering (1975). Owners of factories and large chain stores were heavily fined, with some being imprisoned and other's licenses being revoked. Sanctions were imposed on multi-national foreign companies and tons of merchandise stored for speculative purposes were confiscated and sold to consumers at fixed prices.
 Free and Compulsory Education and a daily free meal for all children from kindergarten to 14 years of age. Primary schools were built in hundreds of villages that previously did not have one. In 1978, 25% of Iranians were enrolled in public schools alone. In that same year there were 185,000 students of both sexes studying in Iran's universities. In addition to the above there were over 100,000 students pursuing their studies abroad, of which 50,000 were enrolled in colleges and universities in the United States.
 Free Food for Needy Mothers and for all newborn babies up to the age of two.
 Introduction of Social Security and National Insurance for all Iranians. The National Insurance system provided for up to 100% of the wages during retirement.
 Stable and Reasonable Cost of Renting or Buying of Residential Properties (1977). Controls were placed on land prices and various forms of land speculation.
 Introduction of Measures to Fight against Corruption within the bureaucracy. The Imperial Inspection Commission was founded, consisting of representatives from administrative bodies and people of proven integrity.

Results
There was a minor industrial revolution during this period of reform. Port facilities were improved, the Trans-Iranian Railway was expanded, and the main roads connecting Tehran and provincial capitals were asphalted. Many small factories opened up specializing in clothing, food processing, cement, tiles, paper, and home appliances. Larger factories for textiles, machine tools, and car assembly were also opened. Educational institutions also grew after the launching of the White Revolution. Enrollment in kindergarten increased from 13,300 to 221,990, elementary schools from 1,640,000 to 4,080,000, secondary schools from 370,000 to 741,000 and colleges from 24,885 to 145,210. Not only were new schools opening, but they were also instituting new educational policies designed to undercut clerical control over education and religious education. The Literacy Corps also helped raise the literacy rate from 26 to 42 percent. The White Revolution also included certain reforms of women's rights. Women gained the right to vote, to run for elected office and to serve as lawyers and later judges. The marriageable age for women was also raised to fifteen.

Iran experienced explosive economic expansion with an annual economic growth rate averaging at 9.8%. There was a substantial rise in the Iranian middle class with over one million families becoming small business owners and an estimated 700,000 salaried professionals. The large economic growth was later used to fund arms built up by the Shah who spent billions on purchasing foreign weapons establishing Iran as a geopolitical power. The history of the Persian empire was taught as means to make people feel part of Iran. In the textbook for the third year of high school, for instance, the interference of the Zoroastrian clergy in politics caused the defeat of the Sasanian empire by the Muslim armies. Therefore, religious interference in political affairs was taught to be extremely dangerous.

Economically, the White Revolution was very successful. The White Revolution successfully redistributed land to approximately 2.5 million families, established literacy and health corps targeting Iran's rural areas, and resulted in a slew of social and legal reform. In the decades following the revolution, per capita income for Iranians skyrocketed. The rapid rise in Iran's revenues paved the way for increased state spending used to fund major industrial development projects in Iran.

Problems and Criticism

Land reform, which was the focus of the White Revolution, did what it was intended to do, weaken the nobles and landlords. In their place, though, emerged a new group of commercial farmers, and many previously large landowning families, such as the Pahlavi family, managed to renovate themselves into these commercial farmers. A rapid expansion of small landowners did occur, but the peasantry as a whole did not acquire land. Only roughly half of the rural population received any land, and many of the people who did receive land did not receive enough to sustain themselves. The result of the White Revolution was that the rural population could be separated into three groups: prosperous farmers, small landowners, and village laborers. The first group was the only group to really benefit from the land reforms, and this group consisted of former village headmen, bailiffs, and some former landlords. The second group consisted of sharecroppers who received no more than 10 hectares of land. Most of these people ended up trading their land in for shares in state cooperatives. The last group received no land at all, and survived as farm hands, laborers, or shepherds. Many of them migrated to urban centers for work.

In late 1978, there had been widespread dissatisfaction among Iranian farmers with regards to land reforms which were supposed to empower them. The Shah's reforms overvalued grandiose inefficient industries over agriculture leading to a sense of negligence among the farmers. Mismanagement and corruption resulted in waste of many funds designated for agricultural development. Emigrations to cities resulted in more demand than could be met by production. Even though reforms turned many peasants into land-owners it imposed on them costs such as taxes, purchase of seeds, water and equipment that they were not burdened with when they worked for landowners, while also eliminating services such as health and education that were provided for them by landlords under the traditional system. An influx of agricultural imports from US also reduced the farmers' market share.

In the beginning, the White Revolution received most of its criticism from two main groups: the clergy, and the landlords. The landlords were angry about the land reforms because their land was bought by the government and then sold in smaller plots to the citizenry at a lower price. They also did not appreciate the government undercutting their authority when it came to dealing with peasants or land laborers.

The powerful Shī‘ah clergy were also angered at the reforms that removed much of their traditional powers in the realms of education and family law, as well as lessening their previously strong influence in the rural areas.  A "large percentage of the upper echelon of the clergy came from landowning families" deeply affected by the reform and much absentee rent income went directly to the clergy and their institutions.  The rents from an estimated 10,000 villages whose rents helped finance the clerical establishment were eligible for redistribution.

The group, or more appropriately, the man who most openly opposed the White Revolution and the Shah himself was Ruhollah Khomeini. Although the clergy in Iran were not happy about many aspects of the White Revolution, such as granting suffrage to women, and the secular local election bill as well as land reforms, the clergy as a whole were not actively protesting. Khomeini, on the other hand, seemed to undergo a serious change of thought from the traditional role and practices of Shi’ite clergy, and actively spoke out against the new reforms and the Shah. In a speech at Feyziyeh School in June 1963, Khomeini spoke out against the Shah's brutality towards student protests, and for the first time, it was a speech attacking the Shah as a person. This speech did lead to Khomeini's exile, but being outside of Iran did not stop Khomeini's protests, nor did it weaken his influence inside Iran.

Khomeini also attacked provisions of the reforms that would allow members of Iran's non-Muslim minority to be elected or appointed to local offices:

A couple of months later on Ashura, Khomeini gave an angry speech attacking the Shah as a "wretched miserable man." Two days later, on June 5, Khomeini was arrested. This sparked three days of rioting and left several hundred dead. The riots were remembered in speeches and writings as the time when the army "slaughtered no less than 15,000" according to Khomeini. Khomeini was released from house arrest in April 1964 but sent into exile that November.

Aftermath

Immediate consequences

The most important and relevant consequence of the White Revolution and the reforms it brought, was the rising popularity of Ruhollah Khomeini. With the growing perception of government corruption, and the implementation of reforms through the White Revolution, Khomeini grew to be an outspoken political enemy of the Shah. The White Revolution was the catalyst for Khomeini's change in thought. Once Khomeini, as a respected member of the clergy, started to openly oppose the Shah and call for his overthrow, people of all different professions and economic status began to see him as a figure to rally behind.

Long-term consequences

Though the White Revolution contributed towards the economic and technological advancement of Iran, the failures of some of the land reform programs and the partial lack of democratic reforms, as well as severe antagonism towards the White Revolution from the clergy and landed elites, would ultimately contribute to the Shah's downfall and the Iranian Revolution in 1979.

See also
Hasan Arsanjani
1963 Iranian referendum

References

Bibliography

External links

 

Mohammad Reza Pahlavi
20th century in Iran
1963 in Iran
Iranian Revolution
Reform in Iran
Articles containing video clips
Land reform
Pahlavi Iran
Revolutions in Iran